The Porsche Panamericana is a concept automobile produced by Porsche AG. It was designed by Dutchman Harm Lagaay along with Steve Murkett (designers) and Ulrich Bez (technical director) to preview some design features that would be on the upcoming 993 generation 911. It was also built as a gift for Ferry Porsche for his 80th birthday. The name comes from the famous Carrera Panamericana race that was held in the 1950s.

The Porsche Panamericana was intended to be only a concept car, and although Lagaay hoped that his creation would be produced at least in small series in 1992, the growing financial crisis at Porsche put an end to his wishes. However the car had an influence in the development of the 993 911 Targa and Boxster. The Panamericana was shown at the 1989 Frankfurt Motor Show, after a development period of only six months.

It was built on the chassis of a 911 (964) Carrera 4 cabriolet and its bodywork was built with plastic and carbon fiber panels. An outstanding characteristic of the car were its wide wheel covers with the objective to have enough room for various sizes of rims and tires, so if necessary it could be transformed into an off-road car.

The three part Speedline rims used on the concept were made exclusively for this Panamericana. The roof line was homogeneously streamlined and sloped gently towards the rear engine deck. It featured a removable waterproof fabric top that could be attached by a pink zipper. Various roof configurations were possible and the car was in fact a hybrid of a targa, convertible, coupe and off-roader.

When viewed from the front its style has a resemblance with the 996 and the Boxster—as could be expected, since Lagaay also has designed the Boxster. In spite of its un-streamlined wheels, its aerodynamic drag coefficient was only 0.30.

References

Panamericana
All-wheel-drive vehicles